Viola Ventures, (formerly Carmel Ventures), established in 2000, is an Israeli venture capital fund with over $1.3 billion under management.

History
Viola Ventures is focused on early stage companies among enterprise infrastructure and applications, frontier and deep technologies (automotive, IOT, AR/VR, drones), software, software as a service, financial technology, Internet, media, communications, semiconductors, and consumer electronics.

Viola Ventures is a member of the Viola Group, a private equity investment group with over $2.8B under management, focused on technology-based investment opportunities in Israel. Shlomo Dovrat was a founder.

Companies
Adapteva
Cellwize
Clarizen
Cloudyn
codefresh
CrediFi
CoolaData
Deep
Dynamic Yield

EverCompliant
Guesty
IronSource
Kampyle (software)
LiveU
Lightricks
LuckyFish
MarketInvoice
MultiPhy
MyThings
NICE Actimize
nsknox
Optimal Plus
Origami logic
Pagaya
ParallelM
Puls (company)
Outbrain
Pagaya
Payoneer
Perfecto Mobile
Personetics
Playbuzz
Protean
RealMatch
Redis Labs
Reduxio
Samanage
Seebo
SimilarWeb
Splacer
SundaySky
Tapingo
Tonara
TradAir
VayaVision
Worthy

Exits

See also
Economy of Israel
Startup Nation

References

External links
 Viola Ventures Homepage
 Viola Group Homepage

Venture capital firms of Israel
Privately held companies of Israel
Investment companies of Israel